Divinity is a nougat-like confection made with whipped egg white, corn syrup, and sugar. Optional ingredients such as flavors, chopped dried fruit and chopped nuts are frequently added. Replacing the sugar with brown sugar results in a related confection called "sea foam".

History
Believed to have originated in the U.S. during the early 1900s, the candy's current form can be traced to a recipe from 1915. Another earlier version, which included the use of milk, can be traced to around 1907.

One proposed theory for its origins is that in the early 20th century, corn syrup (a major ingredient) became commonly used as a popular sugar substitute. New recipes incorporating corn syrup were frequently created by the major manufacturers, one of which may have been divinity.

The origins of the name are not clear. The most popular theory is simply that when first tasted, someone declared it to be, "Divine!" and the name stuck.

Divinity has at times been referred to as a "Southern candy", most likely because of the frequent use of pecans in the recipe. It eventually made its way north, and today its recipe can be found in many cookbooks.

Weather and altitude
Humidity during preparation can affect the quality of divinity. For a batch to be successful, the humidity must be low enough for the candy to dry properly.

Due to the high amounts of sugar, divinity acts like a sponge. If the environment is very humid (over 50%) the candy will absorb moisture from the air, remaining gooey. This can be circumvented by heating the molten sugar to a higher temperature, typically up to around 270 degrees Fahrenheit. Under the right conditions, it is a soft, white candy which should be dry to the touch.

Divinity, like many other confections and baked goods, needs to have its recipe altered for high-altitude areas (over 3500 feet). One method is to reduce the temperature of the sugar mixture by about ten degrees Fahrenheit.

In popular culture
In the Peanuts comic strip in the 1960s, Linus Van Pelt was known to have an affinity for divinity, even being prepared to compliment his sister Lucy to receive a piece.
The B-52's song "Give Me Back My Man" features the line "Throws divinity on the sand", as the narrator's attempt to entice a hungry shark into sparing her sweetheart's life in exchange for the candy. This explanation is provided by Cindy Wilson in the book The B-52's Universe by Mats Sexton. The band, being from Athens, Georgia, would be familiar with this Southern candy.
In the 1985 American romantic drama film Perfect, starring John  Travolta and Jamie Lee Curtis, Curtis's character's mother talks about making the world's best divinity, offering some to Travolta.
In the 2006 film Charlotte's Web, the town pastor offers the Arables divinities when they come to him about Charlotte's first "miraculous" web writing.

See also

 Marshmallow
 Meringue

References

American confectionery
Confectionery
Christmas food